Hozo is an Afroasiatic language spoken mostly in the Kondala woreda of Mirab Welega Zone (Western Oromia) by peoples generically known as "Mao". There are smaller groups of Hozo speakers in Mana Sibu woreda. The term Hozo is usually understood by the Mao to refer to a clan. Hozo speakers prefer to call themselves Amo. Hozo and Seze are sometimes called Begi Mao. Hozo is spoken by roughly 3,000 people in Ethiopia. Hozo is also a clan in the Begi area. The Hozo language is also known as Begi-Mao and Mao of Begi. Its classification is Afro-Asiatic, Omotic, and Mao. The word Mao is Omotic and means ‘man; people’, occurring as [ma:ɪ] in Seze and as [mɔ:] in Hozo. Mao is frequently used as an ethnic term. There is a kind of Mao identity across language differences in Ethiopia. While it is generally accepted today that Omotic is one of the primary branches of the Afro-Asiatic family, the position of the four languages Hozo, Seze, Ganza and Northern Mao is still being discussed. The Mao languages are the least documented within Omotic, and  Omotic  itself  is  the  least  documented  of  the  Afroasiatic  groups.

Geographic distribution
The Omotic Mao languages Seze and Hozo form a compact area in Oromia Regional State surrounded by Oromo speakers on three sides. There seems to be some disagreement amongst the scientists as well as amongst the speakers in how far Seze and Hozo can be classified as two different languages or as dialects of the same language. It has been argued that Seze and Hozo are not two different languages; just two different dialects from village to village. The area where Hozo is predominantly spoken appears to be scattered, and there are only a few villages where Hozo is reported as the only Omotic Mao language. Hozo people prefer less permanent forms of settlements for their families and herds. Omotic languages include Anfillo, Ari, Bambassi, Kara, Kefa, Gana, Dime, Nayi, Sheko, Hozo, Yemsa, and Welaytta.

Classification

Hozo is an Omotic language. Omotic languages are an Ethiopian linguistic group consisting of more than twenty-five distinct languages. Omotic languages developed in the southwestern region near the river Omo, which gave the group its name. Distinct ethnic groups in Ethiopia speak individual languages classified as Omotic.

Largely verbal, the Omotic languages are rarely written down. When they are written, either the Ge’ez (Ethiopic) or Latin alphabet is used, but no standard transliteration from the Ethiopic to the Latin exists. Ge’ez is the ancient language of Ethiopia, which was first introduced as an official written language during the first Aksumite Kingdom between the first and seventh centuries BCE. The earliest known inscriptions of Ge’ez date to the fifth century BCE. Written in horizontal lines from left to right, it was created based on the Sabean/Minean alphabet and is still used by the Ethiopian Orthodox Church in the twenty-first century.

Ethiopian languages are classified into four major groups: Semitic, Cushitic, Omotic, and Nilo-Saharan. The Omotic languages are largely verbal and have several defining characteristics: the majority of vocabulary is monosyllabic, and the languages have ten vowel-sounds: five short and five long. Scholars estimate that there are between twenty-five and forty Omotic languages, but the group has not been extensively studied.

An ongoing debate among linguists exists regarding the inclusion of Omotic languages in the Afro-Asiatic phylum. Experts cannot agree as to whether the system should be labeled as Afro-Asiatic, Nilo-Saharan, or something unique. Until the 1960s, Omotic languages were considered as a west-Cushitic subgrouping.

History of scholarship

After World War II, efforts began to document Ethiopia’s history; however, much more attention was paid to the northern region, which had many Christian communities, a connection to the Ark of the Covenant, and the rock-hewn churches. Little attention was paid to the southern and southwestern Omo valley. Then a socialist coup in 1974 halted most research and expeditions, leaving vast gaps of knowledge about Omotic speakers and their history. Omotic languages are not well studied.

References

Further reading 
 Bender, M. Lionel (2007): Hozo-Sezo. in: Uhlig, Siegbert (ed.): Encyclopaedia Aethiopica Vol.3, Wiesbaden, pp. 85–86.

Languages of Ethiopia
Omotic languages
Mao languages